Jane was launched at Kingston upon Hull in 1813 as a West Indiaman. Between 1818 and 1836 she was a whaler in the northern whale fishery. She then became a merchantman and was wrecked in 1866.

West Indiaman
Jane entered Lloyd's Register (LR) in 1813 with John Mazon, master, Raines & Co., owners, and trade Hull–Saint Croix. As a West Indiaman she was armed with 10 cannons, though her owners reduced her armament after the end of the Napoleonic Wars. (Once she became a whaler she did not need any armament as she no longer had to fear privateers and pirates in the Caribbean.)

Northern Fisheries whaler
From 1818 on, Jane became a whaler in the Northern Whale Fisheries, first at Greenland and then at the Davis Strait.

The following data is from Coltish:

On 8 April 1828 Lloyd's List reported that Jane, Maddison, master, had put into Stromness leaky. Three days later it reported that she had been surveyed and had resumed her voyage.

Merchantman
After having returned from the Davis Strait in 1836 without having killed a single whale (i.e., "Clean"), and with whaling in the previous two years having been almost as poor, her owners shifted her to the merchant trade.

In 1842 Captain W. Tather sailed Jane to Greenland again, but the voyage was not very successful. She killed one whale and 861 seals.

Fate
LR for 1867 had unchanged information from that for 1865, except that it carried the annotation "[wr]ecked".

Citations

References
 

1813 ships
Ships built in Kingston upon Hull
Age of Sail merchant ships of England
Whaling ships
Maritime incidents in 1866